Gutach is a municipality in the district of Ortenau in Baden-Württemberg in Germany.

The borough is home to the Black Forest Open-Air Museum.

Sons and daughters of the community 
 Anton Joos (1900-1999), communist functionary

Other personalities who have worked in the church 

 Wilhelm Hasemann (1850-1913), painter – worked and died in Gutach
 Max Ludwig (1873-1940), writer, painter and graphic artist – lived temporarily in Gutach

References

Ortenaukreis